Thiethylperazine (Torecan, Norzine) is an antiemetic of the phenothiazine class. It is an antagonist of dopamine receptors (DRD1, DRD2, DRD4) as well as of 5-HT2A, 5-HT2C receptors, mAChRs (1 through 5), α1 adrenergic receptor and H1 receptor.

Thiethylperazine activates the transport protein ABCC1 that clears beta-amyloid from brains of mice.

Pharmacokinetics

Distribution 
This drug is highly lipofilic and it binds with membranes and serum proteins (over 85%). It accumulates in organs with high blood flow and penetrates the placenta. It cannot be removed with dialysis.

Metabolism 
It is mainly metabolised in the liver and only 3% is eliminated unchanged. Torecan's half-life is 12 h.

Teratogenicity 
In toxic doses above the terapeutic window, it increases the rate of cleft palate occurrence.

Antypsychotic activity 
Theithylperazine may possess antypsychotic activity due to the antagonism of 5-HT2 and D2 receptors. Because of this, it would not cause extrapyramidal symptoms. Nevertheless, it was never marketed as such drug.

One cause of acute dystonia occurred in a 19-year-old male patient after discontinuation of this drug.

Overdose 
Signs of acute thiethylperazine overdose include: extrapyramidal symptoms, confusion, convulsions, respiratory depression and hypotension.

Synthesis

Goldberg reaction between 3-(ethylsulfanyl)aniline [1783-82-0] (1) and 2-chlorobenzoic acid [118-91-2] (2) to give the diarylamine, CID:82254530 (3). The carboxyl in the anthranilic acid residue, having performed its activating function, is then thermolytically removed to form [68083-49-8] (4). Upon treatment with sulfur and iodine, we get predominantly the phenothiazine [46815-10-5] (5); The rxn may well be aided by the presence of the electron donating thioether at the para-position. Alkylation  with 1-(ɣ̞-chloropropyl)-4-methylpiperazine [104-16-5] (6) in the presence of sodamide affords Thiethylperazine (7).

References

Antiemetics
Piperazines
Phenothiazines
Thioethers